This was the first edition of the tournament.

Alexa Guarachi and Erin Routliffe won the title after defeating Usue Maitane Arconada and Caroline Dolehide 6–3, 7–6(7–5) in the final.

Seeds

Draw

Draw

References
Main Draw

FineMark Women's Pro Tennis Championship - Doubles